On 23 December 1983, Korean Air Lines Flight 084 (KAL084), a McDonnell Douglas DC-10-30 performing a cargo flight, collided during its takeoff roll with SouthCentral Air Flight 59 (SCA59), a Piper PA-31-350, on runway 06L/24R (now 07L/25R) at Anchorage International Airport, as a result of the KAL084 flight crew becoming disoriented while taxiing in dense fog and attempting to take off on the wrong runway.  Both aircraft were destroyed, but no fatalities resulted.

Accident
At 1215 Yukon Standard Time, Flight 59 was cleared from Anchorage to Kenai in accordance with its filed flight plan; however, clearance delivery told the pilot to expect a delay until 1244 due to the heavy fog covering the airport, so the pilot shut down the aircraft and he and his passengers deplaned temporarily.  After reboarding and recontacting the tower at 1234, Flight 59 was delayed for about an hour at its parking location due to the continued dense fog, before finally requesting and receiving a taxi clearance around 1339 as visibility began to improve.  SCA 59 arrived at taxiway W-3 (which connects the main east–west taxiway to the approach end of runway 6L) at 1344, holding short of runway 6L until the runway visual range (RVR) reached , the minimum required for the flight to take off.

At 1357, the Anchorage ground controller cleared Korean Air Lines Flight 084 to taxi for a departure on either runway 6R or runway 32; the flight crew chose runway 32. The flight crew's selection of runway 32 was contrary to Korean Air Lines' operating specifications, as these required a visibility of at least one-quarter mile for takeoff on runway 32 at Anchorage, while the visibility at the time was only one-eighth of a mile. (The National Transportation Safety Board [NTSB], which investigated the accident, was unable to determine why the flight crew chose runway 32 instead of runway 6R, in part because the aircraft's cockpit voice recorder (CVR) was never recovered.) The proper taxi route from the north apron (where the DC-10 was parked) to runway 32 would have involved taxiing south to the east–west taxiway, then making a right turn onto the east–west taxiway and following it to the threshold of runway 32 before turning right again onto the runway. However, the flight instead taxied southwest on taxiway W-1 to runway 6L/24R and lined up on the latter runway, facing west. The heavy fog prevented the ground controller from being able to see the flight's taxi route and impaired the KAL084 flight crew's ability to navigate around the airport; additionally, some of the lighted taxiway and runway designation signs along the flight's course were partially or fully burned out, making the signs less visually conspicuous and harder to see, and the intersections of taxiway W-1 with the east–west taxiway and with runway 6L/24R lacked signage to indicate the identity of either taxiway (the latter deficiency was rectified after the accident). After taxiing into position on what the KAL084 flight crew thought was runway 32, the captain expressed some uncertainty that the aircraft was on the correct runway, and briefly considered switching to runway 6R, but, reassured by his first officer's certainty that they were on runway 32, the captain reported at 1403 that Flight 084 was holding in position on runway 32, and, at 1404, the flight was cleared for takeoff. At no time did the flight crew, despite the uncertainty expressed by the captain, attempt to use their instruments to verify that the heading of the runway they were on matched that of runway 32; the NTSB was unable to determine the reason for this omission.

At 1405:28, the Anchorage tower controller cleared SCA59 to taxi into position and hold on runway 6L, as the RVR had risen to the required 1,800 feet; 50 seconds later, at 1406:18, KAL084 radioed that it was starting its takeoff roll.  Shortly afterwards, the pilot of SCA59 saw headlights approaching, which he initially assumed to be from a truck on the runway.  After realizing that the lights were in fact from an aircraft on its takeoff roll, he ducked down low and yelled for his passengers to do the same.  Meanwhile, the captain of Flight 084, seeing the PA-31 in his aircraft's path, applied up elevator and left rudder, lifting the DC-10's nose landing gear off the ground and causing its main body gear (mounted on the aircraft's centerline between the left and right wing gear) to swing to the right; as a result, the PA-31's fuselage was straddled by the DC-10's body gear and left wing gear, instead of being struck head-on by the body gear (which would likely have resulted in fatalities on board the smaller aircraft).  After striking Flight 59, KAL084 continued off the end of the runway at far below flying speed, crashed through seven non-frangible towers supporting the runway 6L approach lighting system, came to rest  past the end of the runway, and immediately caught fire.

Three of the passengers on board SCA59 received minor injuries, while the remaining passengers and the pilot were uninjured, although the aircraft was destroyed by the impact (the left and right wings were sheared off by the DC-10's main landing gear, while the DC-10's nose gear caved in the right side of the cockpit roof and then tore off part of the PA-31's vertical stabilizer); the three flight crew of KAL084 were seriously injured by impact forces, but managed to escape their aircraft before it was consumed by fire.  (Some initial media reports erroneously listed seven injuries among the SCA59 occupants and none aboard KAL084.)

Other runway collisions in December 1983

Coincidentally, the Anchorage accident was one of four runway collisions involving large air carrier aircraft in December 1983, all of which occurred in conditions of restricted visibility:

 On 7 December, the Madrid runway disaster occurred when an Iberia Boeing 727 on its takeoff roll collided in fog with an Aviaco Airlines McDonnell Douglas DC-9, resulting in 93 fatalities and the destruction of both aircraft.
 On 19 December, a Japan Air Lines Boeing 747 landing on runway 6R at Anchorage in fog struck an airport truck taking runway friction measurements, destroying the truck and severely injuring its driver while slightly damaging the 747.
 On 20 December, Ozark Air Lines Flight 650, a DC-9, struck and destroyed a snow sweeper while landing at Sioux Falls, South Dakota, in a snowstorm, breaking off the aircraft's right wing and killing the driver of the snow sweeper.

See also
 Runway safety
 Linate Airport disaster, another runway collision in fog due to a pilot taking an incorrect taxi route
 1990 Wayne County Airport runway collision, another runway collision in fog due to a pilot taking an incorrect taxi route
 Madrid runway disaster, another December 1983 runway collision in fog due to a pilot taking an incorrect taxi route
 Comair Flight 5191, another accident involving a flight crew taking off on a wrong runway when this could have been avoided by use of instruments to crosscheck the runway heading
 Singapore Airlines Flight 006, a case where a crew attempted a takeoff on a runway closed for construction, due, in part, to reduced visibility

Notes

References

External links
 NTSB accident report (summary, PDF)
 Accident description (DC-10) at the Aviation Safety Network (archive)
 Accident description (PA-31) at the Aviation Safety Network Wikibase (archive)
 Footage of the accident scene on YouTube, narrated by an ARFF captain who responded to the crash

Lawsuits arising from the accident:

 Korean Air Lines v. State of Alaska
 State of Alaska v. Korean Air Lines
 State of Alaska v. Oriental Fire & Marine Insurance

1983 in Alaska
December 1983 events in the United States
Airliner accidents and incidents involving ground collisions
Airliner accidents and incidents caused by pilot error
Airliner accidents and incidents involving fog
Aviation accidents and incidents in the United States in 1983
Airliner accidents and incidents in Alaska
Accidents and incidents involving the McDonnell Douglas DC-10
Accidents and incidents involving cargo aircraft
Accidents and incidents involving the Piper PA-31
Korean Air accidents and incidents
Runway incursions